Fernanda Veirano (born 6 June 1973) is a former synchronized swimmer from Brazil.

References 

1973 births
Living people
Brazilian synchronized swimmers
Olympic synchronized swimmers of Brazil
Synchronized swimmers at the 1992 Summer Olympics